Batteries & Supercaps is a monthly peer-reviewed scientific journal covering electrochemical energy storage and its applications. It is published by Wiley-VCH on behalf of Chemistry Europe.

According to the Journal Citation Reports, the journal has a 2021 impact factor of 6.043.

References

External links

Chemistry Europe academic journals
Chemistry journals
English-language journals
Wiley-VCH academic journals
Monthly journals